Einsteinium triiodide is an iodide of the synthetic actinide einsteinium which has the molecular formula EsI3. This crystalline salt is an amber-coloured solid. It glows red in the dark due to einsteinium's intense radioactivity.

It crystallises in the hexagonal crystal system in the space group R with the lattice parameters a = 753 pm and c = 2084.5 pm with six formula units per unit cell. Its crystal structure is isotypic with that of bismuth(III) iodide.

References

Further reading

Einsteinium compounds
Iodides
Actinide halides